Peter G. "Pat" Stark (April 8, 1930 – June 19, 2020) was an American college football player and coach. He served as the head football coach at the University of Rochester from 1969 to 1983, compiling a record of 69–64–3. As a quarterback at Syracuse University, Stark was drafted by the Pittsburgh Steelers in the 1954 NFL Draft. He was also a member for the Syracuse men's basketball team from 1951 to 1953, averaging 7.3 points per game.

References

1930 births
2020 deaths
American football quarterbacks
American men's basketball players
Harvard Crimson football coaches
Rhode Island Rams football coaches
Syracuse Orange football players
Syracuse Orange men's basketball players
Rochester Yellowjackets football coaches
People from Penfield, New York